Elaine Virginia Rosenthal Reinhart (July 3, 1896 — May 12, 1993) won the Women's Western Amateur golf championship in 1915, 1918, and 1925. Her home course was the Ravisloe Country Club in Homewood, Illinois.

Biography
She was born as Elaine Virginia Rosenthal on July 3, 1896 in Chicago, Illinois to Benjamin Jefferson Rosenthal and Hannah W. Stumer. She won the Women's Western Amateur championship in 1915 and 1918. She married Sylvain Louis Reinhardt of Dallas, Texas on December 10, 1921 in Chicago, Illinois. Her husband was on the Yale Bulldogs football team at Yale University. She won the Women's Western Amateur championship a third time in 1925 at the Glen View Country Club. Her combined three-day score was a 256, beating her closest rival, Virginia Wilson, who scored a 264. She also defeated the previous champion, Lucia Mida, who scored a 274.

Rosenthal also won the North and South Women's Amateur in 1917 and finished runner-up to Katherine Harley in the 1914 U.S. Women's Amateur.

Legacy
She was inducted into the Illinois Golf Hall of Fame in 1995.

Tournament wins
1915 Women's Western Amateur
1917 North and South Women's Amateur
1918 Women's Western Amateur
1925 Women's Western Amateur

References

American female golfers
Jewish American sportspeople
Golfers from Chicago
People from Homewood, Illinois
1896 births
1993 deaths